Dagana may refer to:
 Dagana, Senegal a town
 Dagana Department, Senegal
 Dagana River, Senegal
 Dagana Department, Chad
 Dagana District, Bhutan